Michael Weinstein may refer to:

 Mike Weinstein (born 1949), Member of the Florida House of Representatives
 Michael H. Weinstein (born 1960), Swiss composer 
 Michael L. Weinstein, former U.S. Air Force officer, founder of the Military Religious Freedom Foundation
 Michael A. Weinstein (1942–2015), American political philosopher and political scientist
 AIDS Healthcare Foundation, founded by Michael Weinstein